"You Can't Blame the Train" is a song written by American singer-songwriter Terri Sharp. The original version was recorded by American singer-songwriter Don McLean in 1987 and family country group The Hollanders recorded their own version in 1991.

Don McLean version

"You Can't Blame the Train" was recorded by Don McLean in 1987, and was released as the lead single from his ninth studio album Love Tracks (1988). The song was produced by Dave Burgess.

McLean would also record another Sharp-penned song, "Eventually", for the same album. Sharp recalled in 2012 of how McLean came to record the two tracks, "I was signed by Hank Williams Jr. to Bocephus Music in 1987 because of 'You Can't Blame the Train' and 'Eventually', which Don would also record. Dave Burgess was the administrator for my and Hank's catalogue and he was producing a record for Don – that's how the recording happened."

After having no record contract for five years, McLean returned with his ninth studio album Love Tracks in 1988. "You Can't Blame the Train" was released as the album's lead single in 1987 and reached number 49 on the Billboard Hot Country Singles chart. Commenting on the song's appearance on the charts, along with the follow-up single "Love in My Heart", McLean told the Milwaukee Journal in 1988, "Two songs from the LP are already on the country charts, so we are starting to crack the country charts, which is not an easy thing to do. There is a lot of competition."

Writing
Sharp wrote "You Can't Blame the Train" in 1986. In 2012, she recalled,

Critical reception
On its release, Billboard wrote, "The normally reflective McLean delivers this little essay on self-destruction with cynically energetic abandon; sharp hook and a pronounced beat." Cash Box listed the single as one of their "feature picks" during October 1987. They commented, "McLean has had a hard time gaining radio acceptance with his recent singles, but that should change with this release! This is a well-written tune on which McLean turns in an excellent country vocal performance. Pay special attention to the clever lyrics, if you can concentrate past Don's fine effort."

In 1997, The Daytona Beach News-Journal commented how McLean had "meandered between roots rock and R&B" with the song. In a retrospective review of Love Tracks, Jim Esch of AllMusic noted the song "rollicks along with some verve".

Track listing
7" single
"You Can't Blame the Train" - 3:07
"Perfect Love" - 3:22

7" single (US promo)
"You Can't Blame the Train" - 3:07
"You Can't Blame the Train" - 3:07

Personnel
 Don McLean - vocals
 Dave Burgess - producer
 Joe Bogan - engineer, mixing
 Gary Paczosa - assistant engineer

Charts

The Hollanders version

"You Can't Blame the Train" was covered by American Nashville music group The Hollanders in 1991, who released their version on VCA Records as a single from their album Family Ties. Like McLean's version, the Hollanders' recording was also produced by Dave Burgess. The song reached number 36 on the Cash Box Country Singles chart.

A music video was filmed to promote the single which won the People's Choice Award. The video showed footage of members of the band singing the song at a train station as well as footage of the band performing the song on stage.

Critical reception
On its release, Cash Box listed the single as one of their "indie feature picks" during March 1991. They commented, "With an electrifying contemporary country flavor, 'You Can't Blame the Train' spits out racing energy, unique sibling harmony and lyrics which defend the often accused party of a break-up."

Track listing
7" single
"You Can't Blame the Train" - 3:22
"You Can't Blame the Train" - 3:22

Personnel
 Susie - banjo, bass guitar, vocals
 Janet - lead guitar, vocals
 Terri - drums, vocals
 Brenda - keyboards, vocals
 Jeff - instruments
 David - fiddle
 Dave Burgess - producer

Charts

Other cover versions
 Writer Terri Sharp later recorded her own version of the song, which appeared on YouTube in 2011.
 In 2014, Heather Dickson worked alongside Sharp to record her album Eventually, which featured a cover version of "You Can't Blame the Train", along with other Sharp compositions such as "Eventually".

References

1987 songs
1987 singles
1991 singles
Capitol Records singles
Don McLean songs